Broad-spectrum antivirals (BSAs) are a class of molecules or compounds, which inhibit the replication of a broad range of viruses (i.e. viruses belonging to two or more viral families). BSAs could be divided into experimental and investigational agents, and approved drugs. BSAs work by inhibiting viral proteins (such as polymerases and proteases) or by targeting host cell factors and processes exploited by different viruses during infection. As of 2021, there are 150 known BSAs in varying stages of development, effective against 78 human viruses. BSAs are potential candidates for treatment of emerging and re-emerging viruses, such as ebola, marburg, and SARS-CoV-2. Many BSAs show antiviral activity against other viruses than originally investigated (such as remdesivir and interferon alpha). Efforts in drug repurposing for SARS-CoV-2 is currently underway. A database of BSAs and viruses they inhibit could be found here (https://drugvirus.info/).

See also 
 Broad-spectrum antibiotic
 Broad-spectrum therapeutic

References 

Antiviral drugs
Viruses